Shawn Smith may refer to:

Shirley Patterson (1922 – 1995), a Canadian-born actress also known as Shawn Smith  
Shawn Smith (musician) (1965 – 2019), American singer, songwriter, and musician
Shawn Smith (American football), a National Football League (NFL) referee
Shawn Smith (Colorado), associated with election denial in Colorado and Tina Peters (politician)

See also
Shaun Smith (disambiguation)
Sean Smith (disambiguation)